Andrei Sergeyevich Golubev (born 27 January 1993) is a Russian football goalkeeper. He plays for FC Neftekhimik Nizhnekamsk.

Club career
He made his debut in the Russian Second Division for FC Zenit-Izhevsk on 8 June 2011 in a game against FC Volga Ulyanovsk.

He made his Russian Football National League debut for FC Neftekhimik Nizhnekamsk on 7 July 2019 in a game against FC Mordovia Saransk.

References

1993 births
Sportspeople from Izhevsk
Living people
Russian footballers
Association football goalkeepers
FC Zenit-Izhevsk players
FC Neftekhimik Nizhnekamsk players
Russian First League players
Russian Second League players